Frank John Eustace  (November 7, 1873 – October 16, 1932), was a Major League Baseball catcher for the Louisville Colonels during the 1896 season. His minor league career lasted from 1894 through 1910 and included one year as a player/manager.

External links 

1873 births
1932 deaths
Major League Baseball shortstops
Baseball players from New York (state)
Louisville Colonels players
19th-century baseball players
Minor league baseball managers
Allentown Kelly's Killers players
Philadelphia Colts players
Reading Actives players
Pottsville Colts players
Hartford Bluebirds players
Indianapolis Indians players
Minneapolis Millers (baseball) players
Omaha Omahogs players
St. Joseph Saints players
Hartford Indians players
Buffalo Bisons (minor league) players
Columbus Buckeyes (minor league) players
Columbus Senators players
Grand Rapids Furnituremakers players
Philadelphia Athletics (minor league) players
Harrisburg Ponies players
Springfield Ponies players
Springfield Maroons players
Syracuse Stars (minor league baseball) players
Utica Pentups players
Concord Marines players
Manchester Textiles players
Roanoke Tigers players
Youngstown Steelmen players